Lanini is an Italian surname. Notable people with the surname include:

Bernardino Lanini (1511– 1578), Italian Renaissance painter
Eric Lanini (born 1994), Italian footballer
Stefano Lanini (born 1994), Italian footballer

See also
Lanni

Italian-language surnames